Matthew John Carland (8 September 1909 – 5 February 1998) was an Australian rules footballer who played with Essendon and Footscray in the Victorian Football League (VFL).

Notes

External links 

1909 births
1998 deaths
Australian rules footballers from Victoria (Australia)
Essendon Football Club players
Western Bulldogs players
Castlemaine Football Club players
Nathalia Football Club players